Agilulf (420 – after 482) was a chieftain of the Suebian Quadi. He was probably the son of Hunimund, and was possibly a follower of Arius. Agilulf is considered the founder of the Agilolfings dynasty of the Baiuvarii.

Sources
 

5th-century Germanic people
420 births
Year of death unknown
Germanic warriors
Quadi rulers